Zheng Bijian (born  1932) is a Chinese politician and government advisor whose theories about globalism and transparency emphasize the importance of projecting soft power and peace. Zheng is recognized for coining the term "China's peaceful rise" as part of a Ministry of State Security (MSS) influence operation.

Early life and education 
Zheng was born in Fushun County, Sichuan. He joined the Chinese Communist Party (CCP) in 1952 and two years later completed postgraduate work in political economics at the Renmin University of China. He has conducted research for the party, state government, and the Chinese Academy of Social Sciences.

After his postgraduate work, Zheng conducted research for the Chinese Academy of Social Sciences. His theory and research focused on editing the works of Mao Zedong. He was later named deputy director-general of the international affairs research center at the State Council in the late 1970s. In 1988, he served as the vice-president of the Chinese Academy of Social Sciences and as the director for the academy's research institute.

Career 
Having held many official posts, Zheng the China Institute for Innovation and Development Strategy in 2010 and serves as its chairman (CIIDS). CIIDS is committed to providing strategic advice to government officials through academic and scientific research. It develops strategies for social governance, technology, and military institutions. CIIDS maintains cooperative relationships with Berggruen Institute’s 21st Century Council which co-hosted the Understanding China Conferences of 2013 and 2015. The conferences were attended by former heads of state including: Ernesto Zedillo, Ricardo Lagos, Paul Keating, Kevin Rudd, and Gordon Brown.

He began to work with the Central Committee of the Chinese Communist Party in the late 1970s. He served as deputy director of the publicity department from 1992 to 1997. Since 2003 he has served on the standing committee of the Chinese People's Political Consultative Conference. Zheng also serves as a Senior Advisor to the Dean of the College of Humanities of the Graduate School of Chinese Academy of Sciences, Chairman of China Sciences and Humanities Forum, and Senior Advisor to Chinese People’s Institute of Foreign Affairs.

Zheng’s work has focused on China’s rise on the international stage, including planning for and commitment to a peace and sustainable prosperity. Sometimes called “China’s Henry Kissinger”, Zeng's theories of strategic cooperation have been well received in international communities. With Zheng as Chairman, CIIDS has attracted a large number of senior strategists, diplomats, scientists, generals, economists and business leaders as participants and advisors. 

The events and conferences organized by CIIDS bring these individuals, groups, and organizations together with Xi Jinping, General Secretary of the Chinese Communist Party, to discuss developmental strategies and foreign relationships.

See also
 Peaceful rise of China, a term Zheng Bijian coined

References

External links
 Biography at China Vitae

1932 births
Living people
Yaohua High School alumni
Chongqing Nankai Secondary School alumni
Catholic University of Peking alumni
Renmin University of China alumni
Politicians from Zigong
Chinese Communist Party politicians from Sichuan
People's Republic of China politicians from Sichuan
Members of the 14th Central Committee of the Chinese Communist Party
Members of the 15th Central Committee of the Chinese Communist Party
Members of the 9th Chinese People's Political Consultative Conference
Members of the Standing Committee of the 10th Chinese People's Political Consultative Conference